Scream Dream is the sixth studio album by American hard rock musician Ted Nugent. The album was released in June 1980 by Epic Records, and reached number 13 on the Billboard 200. It was his last studio album to feature drummer Cliff Davies.

The album-opening "Wango Tango" became an instant Nugent standard, including a humorous middle breakdown section in which he shows off with a carnival barker-esque rap. Other highlights include "Terminus El Dorado", the title track, and "Hard as Nails".

Tracks "Wango Tango" and "Scream Dream" were later included in the compilation album Playlist: The Very Best of Ted Nugent.

Critical reception
Billboard's reviewer left positive response on an album. He wrote: "The aural mayhem created here could be made by no other person than Nugent. While he does nothing on this outing that he hasn't done before, he always does it with enough zest and relish to make his point come across. He continues in the well trod path of hook-laced heavy metal with blazing guitar licks and intentionally humorous lyrics."

Track listing
All songs written and arranged by Ted Nugent.

Personnel
Band members
 Ted Nugent – lead vocals, lead and rhythm guitar
 Charlie Huhn – lead vocals on tracks 4 and 10, backing vocals, rhythm guitar
 Dave Kiswiney – bass, backing vocals
 Cliff Davies – drums, lead vocals on track 8, producer

Additional musicians
The Immaculate Wangettes – backing vocals on track 1

Production
 Ric Browde, David McCullough – associate producers
 Lew Futterman – executive producer
 Tim Geelan – engineer, mixing, mastering supervisor
 Al Hurschman, David Gotlieb, Lou Schlossberg – assistant engineers
 George Marino, Ray Janos – mastering

Charts

Album

Singles

Certifications

See also

1980 in music
Ted Nugent discography

References

1980 albums
Ted Nugent albums
Epic Records albums